Hungary made its Paralympic Games début at the 1972 Summer Paralympics in Heidelberg, with a delegation of four athletes in track and field. Following another appearance in 1976 the country was then absent in 1980.  The Hungarian delegation made a permanent return to the Summer Paralympics in 1984. Hungary first took part in the Winter Paralympics in 2002, and continuously attended the Winter Games through 2010. Hungary was absent from the 2014 Winter Games.

Hungarians have won a total of 107 Paralympic medals (27 gold, 34 silver, 46 bronze), placing the country 32nd on the all-time Paralympic Games medal table. All of these medals have been won at the Summer Games.

Arguably Hungary's most successful Paralympian is Attila Jeszenszky, who won four gold medals in swimming at the 1984 Summer Games. Hungary also boasts the only athlete in the world to have won medals at both the Paralympics and the Olympics. Fencer Pál Szekeres won a bronze medal at the 1988 Summer Olympics, before being disabled in a bus accident and beginning a Paralympic career in wheelchair fencing, which brought him six Paralympic medals - of which three gold.

Medals

Summer Paralympics

Winter Paralympics

Medals by Summer Sport 
Source:

Medals by Winter Sport 
Source:

Medalists

See also
 Hungary at the Olympics

References